The Thomas Saf-T-Liner C2 (often shortened to Thomas C2) is a cowled-chassis school bus manufactured by bus body manufacturer Thomas Built Buses.  Introduced in 2004, the C2 marked the first usage of the Freightliner C2 chassis.  While produced largely for school use, the C2 is also produced for multiple applications, including specialty and commercial configurations.  The C2 is unique in that it is available in capacities up to 81 passengers, the largest of any type C conventional school bus in current production. It is also the only school bus in North America with the option of a manual transmission.

Derived from the Freightliner Business Class M2 medium-duty truck, the C2 consolidated the Saf-T-Liner Conventional and Saf-T-Liner FS-65 conventionals; the latter was produced concurrently with the C2 until December 2006.  While produced with a full-length hood, the C2 adopted other design elements of the Vista conventional to improve loading-zone visibility.

Thomas Built Buses manufactures the C2 in High Point, North Carolina.

Background 

Following the introduction of the Freightliner Business Class M2 medium-duty truck in 2002 as the replacement for the FL-Series, Freightliner began work on an all-new bus chassis based on the M2 to replace the FS-65 bus chassis.  As the parent company of Thomas Built Buses,  Freightliner sought to pair the new bus chassis together with a new Thomas body, allowing the bus company to update its Saf-T-Liner Conventional bus body for the first time since 1962.

In 2004, in preparation for the C2, Thomas completed construction on a second production facility in High Point, North Carolina, adding 275,000 square feet of production capability.  Following the introduction of the C2, its Saf-T-Liner FS-65 predecessor remained in production through the end of 2006, outliving the medium-duty FL-Series by nearly three years.

In October 2012, Thomas delivered its 50,000th Saf-T-Liner C2 to Dean Transportation of Lansing, Michigan.

In June 2018, the 100,000th Thomas Saf-T-Liner C2 was delivered to Montgomery County Public Schools in Virginia.

In 2016, Thomas Built Buses released the 100th Anniversary model of the C2.

Overview

Design and manufacture 
As the Thomas Saf-T-Liner C2 marked the first completely new bus body for the company since 1962, Thomas redesigned a number of its manufacturing techniques coinciding with its introduction.

To minimize the number of rivets and welds (a weak point of structural integrity on a bus body), adhesive bonding was used to complete a number of body joints.  In the cases where fasteners are needed, self-piercing rivets are used.  These engineered fasteners join layers of metal together without punching completely through the bottom layer, thus reducing the likelihood that rivets will become the source of leaks in the future.

To simplify vehicle maintenance, the electrical system of the C2 was redesigned over previous buses.  In place of individually wired circuits, the C2 uses multiplexed wiring.  With the system, switches on interior control panels can be removed and rearranged to suit the driver without any rewiring or reprogramming.

Chassis 

As with all conventional-style school buses, the C2 is derived from a cowled-chassis conventional; the C2 uses the Freightliner C2 variant of the M2.  As with 2000s and 2010s industry practice in school bus manufacturing, chassis and body manufacturers are paired, with Freightliner and Thomas developing the C2 as an integrated vehicle (the Freightliner grille badges are replaced with Thomas badges).

At its launch, Mercedes-Benz MBE diesel engines were the standard engines, with optional Caterpillar C7 and Cummins ISB diesels.  In 2008, the Cummins ISB6.7 replaced the MBE900 as the standard engine, with the C7 discontinued.  From 2010 to 2018, the sole diesel engine in the Thomas C2 was the Cummins ISB6.7; for 2018 production, the Detroit Diesel DD5 becomes an option.

The C2 comes standard with an Allison 2500 automatic transmission with an Allison 3000 automatic transmission as an option.  The Saf-T-Liner C2 is the only school bus in North America offered with a manual transmission; a rarely ordered option is a  Fuller 6-speed transmission.

Body 
In a break from traditional bus body design, as body manufacturers acted as second stage manufacturers adapting the body to the chassis, in the design of the C2, Freightliner-owned Thomas Built Buses designed the body and chassis of Saf-T-Liner C2 as fully integrated components.  A separate body from the Saf-T-Liner EFX/HDX and Minotour, the C2 body shares no parts with its Saf-T-Liner Conventional/FS-65 predecessor.

While Freightliner has also produced cutaway-cab buses derived from the M2 for commercial/transit use, Thomas Built Buses is the only manufacturer to produce a cowled-chassis bus body derived from the M2.  Coinciding with the shift to the Freightliner M2 cowl, several changes were made to improve the functionality over its predecessor.  Most visibly, to improve aerodynamics, the traditional multipane vertical windshield was replaced by a sloped single-piece curved piece of glass (allowing the use of the stock windshield wipers).  Above the windshield, the front bodywork matches the windshield slope; to further improve aerodynamics, the warning lamp lenses are faired into the body (where allowed by regulations).

On the rear of the C2, the body also used flush-mounted glass and warning-lamp lenses.  While not substantially physically taller than its predecessor, Thomas visually extended the height of the C2 with larger passenger windows than previous school buses, along with larger exit doors.

On the exterior, the C2 has largely remained the same throughout its production run.  In late 2007, the passenger windows saw a minor change, with a shift to equal-size window sashes (previously, the top half was larger).  In the rear, the taillights were redesigned and enlarged, later becoming a standard design for all Thomas buses.  To improve driver sightlines, the mirror bracket for the passenger-side rear-view mirrors was extended forward.

In the interior of the  C2, Thomas made many advancements in an effort to maximize parts compatibility between the bus body and donor chassis.  In previous conventional-style school buses, from the firewall rearward, only the steering column and instrument cluster were used.  With the interior of the Thomas C2, the dashboard of Freightliner M2 is used in its entirety, adopting only minor changes (the ignition switch was required to move to the center of the dashboard, due to a driver control panel replacing the driver-side door).

Along with the optimization of aerodynamics, the body of the Thomas C2 also optimized driver visibility.  Following the redesign of the windshield, the entry door was repositioned, creating a large window between the entry door and windshield to view sightlines in the loading zone (a feature adopted from the Thomas Vista and nearly all small school buses); a smaller quarter window was located forward of the driver's sliding window.  In comparison to other Thomas buses, the C2 has enlarged passenger windows and larger emergency exits.

While initially equipped with an air-operated entry door, in 2012, an electric-operated entry door became offered as an option.  Since 2016, a manually operated passenger entry door was added as an option.

Variants

Other uses 
Alongside its yellow school bus configuration, Thomas Built Buses produces multiple configurations of the Saf-T-Liner C2, including MFSAB versions (activity/childcare versions), along with the Transit Liner C2 commercial-use bus.  Through aftermarket manufacturers, the C2 also serves as a donor vehicle for multiple types of specialty vehicles derived from bus bodies.

Alternative fuel, hybrid, and electric powertrains 
In 2007, Thomas introduced a hybrid-electric version of the Saf-T-Liner, named the C2e (stylized as C2e). The parallel hybrid drivetrain was designed by Eaton Corporation; the C2e retains the Cummins ISB engine and adds a 1.9 kW-hr lithium-ion battery pack with a 44 kW electric motor/generator. At least 24 C2e buses were built and delivered to operators in Kentucky and Michigan. In the summer of 2013, Thomas removed the C2e product literature from their website, marking its discontinuation.

In May 2014, Thomas Built Buses began production of a propane-fueled version of the Saf-T-Liner C2.  Powered by a 339 hp 8.0L V8, the C2 Propane is paired with the Allison 2300PTS automatic transmission. The engine is designed by Powertrain Integration (an OEM supplier to General Motors) with the 8.0L V8 named the PIthon. In 2019, the propane engine was enlarged to a DriveForce-branded 8.8 L, supplied by Power Solutions International, which had acquired Powertrain Integration in 2015.

In 2016, a compressed natural gas (CNG) variant of the Saf-T-Liner C2 was released.  The first Type C (conventional-style) school bus produced with a CNG fuel system, the Saf-T-Liner C2 CNG is powered by a version of the Cummins ISB 6.7 engine.

In November 2018, Thomas unveiled a battery-powered prototype of the Thomas Saf-T-Liner C2 designated eC2 or "Jouley" (after the unit of energy). The prototype previews an all-electric C2 intended for production during 2019; it was developed in partnership with Proterra, Inc., who offer a line of transit buses using the same battery-electric drivetrain. The bus is charged using the SAE J1772 CCS Combo 1 connector; a full charge takes approximately 3 hours using a 60 kW DC charger.

The first large order for 50 Jouley buses was placed by Dominion Energy in December 2019 as the first phase of their school bus replacement program, to be delivered by the end of 2020. In February 2021, the Montgomery County Public Schools (Maryland), largest school district in the state, announced they had ordered 326 Jouley buses.

Comparable products 
 Blue Bird Vision
 IC Bus CE-Series

See also

 Freightliner C2—The bus chassis used for the Saf-T-Liner C2.

References

External links

 Yellow Bus, Thomas Saf-T-Liner C2 - Thomas Built Buses—manufacturer website

School buses
Thomas Built Buses